Decline and Fall is a three-part British comedy drama series based on the 1928 novel of the same name by Evelyn Waugh that first aired from 31 March to 14 April 2017 on BBC One. It was adapted by James Wood and directed by Guillem Morales.

Cast

 Jack Whitehall as Paul Pennyfeather
 David Suchet as Dr. Fagan
 Eva Longoria as Margot Beste-Chetwynde
 Douglas Hodge as Grimes
 Vincent Franklin as Prendergast
 Stephen Graham as Philbrick
 Matthew Beard as Arthur Potts
 Oscar Kennedy as Peter Beste-Chetwynde
 Tim Pigott-Smith as Sniggs
 Tom Stourton as Alistair Digby-Vaine-Trumpington
 Katy Wix as Florence Fagan
 Gemma Whelan as Diane Fagan
 Felix Griffin Pain as Tangent
 Hugo Beazley as Clutterbuck
 Tony Guilfoyle as Vicar
 Robert Hughes as Marseille Main Worker
 Eleri Morgan as Jane Jenkins

Episodes

References

External links

2017 British television series debuts
2017 British television series endings
2010s British comedy-drama television series
2010s British television miniseries
English-language television shows
BBC television dramas
Television shows based on British novels
Television series by Tiger Aspect Productions
Television series by Endemol
Television shows set in Wales
Films based on works by Evelyn Waugh